Little Darby Creek may refer to:
 Little Darby Creek (Ohio)
 Little Darby Creek (Pennsylvania)

See also 
 Darby Creek (disambiguation)